

Albums

Singles

Discographies of Mexican artists
Latin pop music discographies